Thomas Patrick Lennon (born August 9, 1970) is an American actor, comedian, screenwriter, producer, director, and novelist. He plays Lieutenant Jim Dangle on the series Reno 911!

Lennon is an accomplished screenwriter of several major studio comedies with writing partner Robert Ben Garant. They wrote the Night at the Museum films, The Pacifier, Balls of Fury, and Baywatch.

Early life
Lennon was born on August 9, 1970  in Oak Park, Illinois. Of Irish and Scottish descent, he is the son of Kathleen (McSheehy) and Timothy Lennon. He graduated from Oak Park and River Forest High School in 1988.

At the age of 16, he met friend and future co-star Kerri Kenney at Theatre Camp at Northwestern University. The two later attended NYU, where they joined a comedy troupe called The New Group.

Career

Acting and performing
While Lennon was a member of The New Group, the comedy troupe changed its name to The State. As they performed their material at theaters and clubs in New York City, they worked on the MTV show You Wrote It, You Watch It. This led to the self-titled series The State (1993–95), which was nominated for a 1995 Cable Ace Award for Best Comedy Series. That same year, they created a special for CBS called The State's 43rd Annual All-Star Halloween Special.

Following the departure of The State from MTV, and failed long-term deals with both ABC and CBS, Lennon, along with Kenney, Robert Ben Garant and Michael Ian Black, went on to create and star in the Comedy Central program Viva Variety (1997–99). The show was based on a sketch that Lennon had written for the final season of The State, called "The Mr. and Former Mrs. Laupin Variety Programme." Viva Variety received a 1997 Cable Ace Award nomination for Best Comedy Series. After Viva Variety, Lennon, Kenney and Garant created and starred in Reno 911! (2003–09). The series was initially slated for Fox, but the channel rejected it for being too risque, and the program eventually ended up on Comedy Central.

Lennon has appeared as a guest star in dozens of TV shows, including The League, Childrens Hospital, Party Down, New Girl, How I Met Your Mother, Comedy Bang Bang, Don't Trust the B---- in Apartment 23. One of his notable guest starring roles was as Joey Tribbiani's blackjack-dealing "identical hand twin" on the Friends fifth-season finale ("The One In Vegas," Pts. I and II). Additionally, he has appeared on Jimmy Kimmel Live!, The Tonight Show, The Daily Show, Late Night with Jimmy Fallon, and at 31, had the second-highest number of appearances on The Late Late Show with Craig Ferguson.

In 2008, Lennon started doing stand-up comedy, occasionally playing guitar and incorporating music. He has appeared on The Meltdown with Jonah and Kumail, John Oliver's New York Stand-Up Show, The Jeselnik Offensive, and The Benson Interruption. He was the guest on the first episode of Chris Hardwick's The Nerdist Podcast, which was recorded in Lennon's garage.

In 2010, Lennon and Garant created and starred in a sitcom pilot for NBC called The Strip. In May that year it was announced that NBC had decided not to produce it as a series.

In November and December 2011, Lennon filled in as guest voice for the robot sidekick Geoff Peterson on the CBS show The Late Late Show with Craig Ferguson.

Lennon has also appeared in numerous films, including Bad Teacher, Memento, How to Lose a Guy in 10 Days, Transformers: Age of Extinction, and I Love You, Man, for which he and co-star Paul Rudd were nominated for a 2009 MTV Movie Award for Best Kiss. In both Christopher Nolan's film Memento (2000) and The Dark Knight Rises (2012), Lennon played the role of a doctor.

Lennon's voice acting work includes Kim Possible, Bob's Burgers, Archer and Planet Sheen, in which he played the character of Pinter. He played Scribble in Secret of the Wings and Tinker Bell and the Legend of the NeverBeast. He supplied the voice of Eddie the Shipboard Computer in the film version of The Hitchhiker's Guide to the Galaxy and plays the voice of Fearless Leader in the 2014 DreamWorks short film version of Rocky and Bullwinkle. He is also the voice of Munk on Dawn of the Croods and the voice of Chief O'Hara in the Warner Brothers animated film Batman: Return of the Caped Crusaders.

Lennon was a producer of the 2013-2017 late-night panel game show, @midnight, hosted by Hardwick, and appeared 17 times on the show as a panelist/contestant. He won the show seven times.

Lennon played Felix Unger in 2015-2017 television series reboot of The Odd Couple opposite Matthew Perry, who played Oscar Madison. In 2016, he co-starred as a scientist in Paramount Animation's Monster Trucks and began a recurring role on the Fox action sitcom Lethal Weapon as Leo Getz, a character previously portrayed on film by Joe Pesci. At the 2016 People's Choice Awards ceremony, he participated in an on-stage sketch parodying the recent gaffe by Steve Harvey at the Miss Universe 2015 pageant.

In 2020 and 2021, he has recurred in Supergirl’s fifth and sixth seasons as Mr. Mxyzpltk, taking over from Peter Gadiot.

In 2020, Lennon reprised his role as Lieutenant Jim Dangle in the seventh season of Reno 911! which aired on Quibi. He also appeared in the 2021 film Reno 911! The Hunt for QAnon. The eighth season of the series, now titled Reno 911! Defunded, premiered on The Roku Channel in February 2022.

Screenwriting
Lennon is a successful screenwriter and script doctor. Most of Lennon's screenplays are written in collaboration with writing partner Robert Ben Garant. Their films have earned over $1.4 billion at the worldwide box office.

Among Garant and Lennon's credits are the Night at the Museum films, the 2005 Disney comedy The Pacifier and the 2006 prison comedy Let's Go to Prison.

In 2010, FX Network ordered a pilot episode for a Garant/Lennon science fiction television comedy called USS Alabama, set 1000 years in the future, aboard a United Nations Peacekeeping spaceship, the U.S.S. Alabama. Garant and Lennon released a book about writing for film called Writing Movies for Fun and Profit: How We Made a Billion Dollars at the Box Office and You Can Too! in 2011.

Garant and Lennon wrote, directed and starred in the 2013 film Hell Baby starring Rob Corddry and Leslie Bibb. The film was produced by Darko Entertainment, and shot on location in New Orleans, Louisiana. Hell Baby premiered at the 2013 Sundance Film Festival. Garant and Lennon are credited as story co-writers on the film version of Baywatch (2017).

More recently, The Machine, written by Garant and Lennon, is set to star Vin Diesel. Additionally, their script Action No. 1 is in pre-production.

Lennon is also the author of four of IFC's "50 Greatest Comedy Sketches of All Time."

Novels
Lennon has written three young adult novels titled Ronan Boyle and the Bridge of Riddles, Ronan Boyle and the Swamp of Certain Death, and Ronan Boyle into the Strangeplace. Ronan Boyle and the Bridge of Riddles debuted on the New York Times Bestseller list. He wrote the book for the theatrical production of "Trading Places: The Musical!" which debuted at the Alliance Theatre in Atlanta in June 2022.

Personal life
Lennon lives in Los Angeles and Wisconsin with his wife, actress Jenny Robertson, and their son Oliver (born 2009). He is a fan of The Smiths and Morrissey, occasionally performing live with the tribute band "Sweet and Tender Hooligans" as a guitarist.

Filmography

Film

Television

Web

References

External links

 
 
 

1970 births
Living people
21st-century American comedians
21st-century American male writers
21st-century American screenwriters
Actors from Oak Park, Illinois
American male comedians
American male film actors
American male screenwriters
American male television actors
American male television writers
American male voice actors
American sketch comedians
American television directors
American television writers
American people of Irish descent
American people of Scottish descent
Comedians from Illinois
Male actors from Illinois
New York University alumni
Screenwriters from Illinois
Showrunners
Television producers from Illinois
Writers from Oak Park, Illinois